The 28th International Film Festival of India was held from 10 to 20 January 1997 in Thiruvananthapuram as a non competitive event. 

The Festival was inaugurated at the Kanakakkunnu Palace by Kerala Chief Minister E. K. Nayanar. American biopic Michael Collins was chosen as the opening film. Deceased Italian actor Marcello Mastroianni was paid a tribute in the screening of his last film Three Lives and Only One Death. Mike Leigh drama Secrets & Lies closed the festival.

Official selections

Opening film 
 Michael Collins

Closing film 
 Secrets & Lies

Indian Panorama 
The Directorate of Film Festivals invited criticism after its rejection of Hindi films Daayraa and Maachis, and Bengali film, Yugant to be screened in the Indian Panorama section. Among others, the following films were subsequently screened:

References 

1997 film festivals
International Film Festival of India
1997 in Indian cinema